Puente de Montañana, in Catalan:  Lo Pont de Montanyana, or in Aragonese: Puent de Montanyana,  is a municipality located in the province of Huesca, Aragon, Spain. According to the 2004 census (INE), the municipality has a population of 102 inhabitants.

References

Municipalities in the Province of Huesca